USS Fortitude may refer to the following ships operated by the United States Navy:

 , was an Accentor-class coastal minesweeper during World War Two
 HSV Fortitude (JHSV-3), original name for  before the Navy took over the project

United States Navy ship names